4-Methylethcathinone or 4-MEC is a chemical that bears a chemical resemblance to mephedrone.  Due to its similarity to mephedrone, it is thought to be a stimulant and entactogen drug of the phenethylamine, amphetamine, and cathinone chemical classes. It has been marketed alone or in mixtures with other substituted cathinones under the name "NRG-2", although other blends such as "NRG-1" may have been more ambiguous with their ingredients.

4-MEC is reported to have been used as the active ingredient in fake "Ecstasy" pills in some countries such as New Zealand.

Recreational use

Some users have injected the drug intravenously. This requires heating the water/4-MEC solution in order for 4-MEC to dissolve. Injecting 4-MEC appears to be rough on veins and is sometimes accompanied by a burning sensation; for this reason 4-MEC should be diluted as much as possible. Intravenous dosages are comparable to oral ones, although more care should be given to safety (with regard to possibility of overdose and long-term effects).

Legality 
In the United States 4-MEC is a schedule 1 controlled substance.

See also 
 4-Ethylmethcathinone
 4-Methylbuphedrone
 4-Methylcathinone
 4-Methylpentedrone
 Substituted cathinone
 Benzedrone
 Mephedrone

References 

Cathinones
Designer drugs
Norepinephrine-dopamine releasing agents
Stimulants